The Honeydripper is an album by blues musician Roosevelt Sykes recorded in 1960 and released on the Bluesville label the following year.

Reception

AllMusic reviewer Ron Wynn stated: "Roosevelt Sykes expertly fit his classic, down-home piano riffs and style into a fabric that also contained elements of soul, funk, and R&B. ... Besides Sykes' alternately bemused, ironic, and inviting vocals, there's superb tenor sax support from King Curtis, Robert Banks' tasty organ, and steady, nimble bass and drum assistance by Leonard Gaskin and drummer Belton Evans.".

Track listing
All compositions by Roosevelt Sykes except where noted
 "Miss Ida B." – 4:57
 "Mislead Mother" – 3:14
 "Yes, Lawd" (Ozzie Cadena) – 9:16
 "I Hate to Be Alone" – 2:01
 "Jailbait" – 2:25
 "Lonely Day" – 4:26
 "Satellite Baby" – 2:46
 "Pocketful of Money" – 2:32
 "She Ain't for Nobody" – 2:47

Personnel

Performance
Roosevelt Sykes – piano, vocals
King Curtis – tenor saxophone
Robert Banks – organ
Leonard Gaskin – bass
Belton Evans – drums

Production
Esmond Edwards – supervision
 Rudy Van Gelder – engineer

References

Roosevelt Sykes albums
1961 albums
Bluesville Records albums
Albums recorded at Van Gelder Studio
Albums produced by Esmond Edwards